Eileen Sutherland-Leveson-Gower, Duchess of Sutherland (3 November 1891 – 24 August 1943), born Lady Eileen Gwladys Butler and styled Marchioness of Stafford from 1912 to 1913, was a British courtier.

Biography

She was born on 3 November 1891 to the 7th Earl of Lanesborough. She was married on 11 April 1912 to George Sutherland-Leveson-Gower, Marquess of Stafford, who succeeded his father as 5th Duke of Sutherland in 1913, whereupon Eileen became Duchess of Sutherland.  In World War I, she was a Red Cross nurse. She was Mistress of the Robes to Queen Mary from 1916 to 1921.

She died in 1943, aged 51. She left no children.

References

1891 births
1943 deaths
British duchesses by marriage
Daughters of Irish earls
Mistresses of the Robes
Eileen Sutherland-Leveson-Gower, Duchess of Sutherland
20th-century English nobility
Wives of knights